Squad is a tactical first-person shooter video game developed by the Canadian game development studio Offworld Industries. Self-published through Steam, it is a spiritual successor to the Project Reality modification for Battlefield 2. Set in the modern day, the game features a mix of real and semi-fictional content, with most of the game taking place in realistic conflicts, such as insurgencies in the Middle East and conflict in Eastern Europe. Squad became available on Steam Early Access on December 15, 2015, and was officially released on Steam on September 23, 2020.

Gameplay 
Squad is a tactical shooter based around squad gameplay designed to encourage teamwork and communication. A match is played between two belligerent teams, with each team being made up of squads that cap at nine players. Players in squads select from various soldier classes which play distinct roles in combat, such as suppressive fire from an automatic rifleman, anti-tank support from a MANPATS gunner, or medical support from a combat medic. A squad of players is led by a squad leader, who can communicate with other allied squad leaders and construct structures such as forward operating bases and defensive emplacements. Any squad leader can additionally nominate himself for the position of commander, who, once voted into position, can coordinate his team's battle plan and call in additional support such as UAV recon and artillery.

Squad borrows many of its gameplay aspects from its predecessor, Project Reality, with its game modes placing heavy emphasis on team coordination. The two teams, utilizing vehicle and infantry warfare, compete over various objectives, such as strategic locations to hold or weapon caches to destroy. To facilitate maneuver warfare, squad leaders can construct forward operating bases around the map, which provide a team-wide location for soldiers to respawn and must be kept supplied by a logistics network. Both teams are kept in check by the "ticket" system, which simulates combat effectiveness. The loss of strategic locations, destruction of forward operating bases or vehicles and soldier deaths all remove tickets from a team's pool, and a match ends once a team's ticket pool has been reduced to zero. A team that fails at defending too many of its strategic objectives will begin to lose tickets rapidly, starting at a loss of one per minute and capping out at a maximum of ten per minute. As such, teams have the ability to achieve victory in multiple ways, such as exhausting the enemy's ability to fight or by completing all of their tactical objectives.

There are currently ten playable factions in Squad, which change based on the map and game mode being played. The real-life militaries featured include the United States Army, Russian Ground Forces, Canadian Army, Australian Army, British Army, United States Marine Corps and the recently added People's Liberation Army. Three generic stock factions are also included: the Insurgents, modeled after various Middle Eastern and Afghan insurgent groups, the Irregular Militia, modeled after the paramilitary forces of Eastern Europe and the Balkans, and the Middle East Alliance, a fictional military alliance amalgamation of the armed forces of various Middle Eastern and Central Asian countries.

Development 
Development of Squad was announced in October 2014 when Project Reality developer Sniperdog (a.k.a. Will Stahl) made a post on the Project Reality forums. The announcement carried the news that the team of fifteen was making a spiritual successor to Project Reality on Epic Games' Unreal Engine 4.

On April 5, 2015, Squad appeared in Steam's Greenlight service and was announced in an update called "Vote For Us". It was officially greenlit eight days later.

Squad was released on Steam Early Access on December 15, 2015, and officially released on Steam on September 23, 2020.

Squad is currently at version 4.2 as of the 21st of February 2023.

Kickstarter 
The Kickstarter campaign started on May 26, 2015. It featured six backer levels with various rewards such as merchandise, in-game rewards, and pre-alpha testing access. Five days after the Kickstarter launch, the game had raised over $200,000.

Sales
As of 2022, the game has sold over 3 million copies.

References

External links 
 Squad website

2020 video games
Crowdfunded video games
First-person shooters
Kickstarter-funded video games
Multiplayer online games
Asymmetrical multiplayer video games
Tactical shooter video games
Unreal Engine games
Indie video games
Video games developed in Canada
Windows games
Windows-only games
Video games set in Europe
Video games set in the Middle East
Video games set in Afghanistan
Video games set in Canada
Video games set in Iraq
Video games set in Russia